Power pitcher is a term in baseball for a pitcher who relies on pitch velocity at the expense of accuracy. Power pitchers usually record a high number of strikeouts, and statistics such as strikeouts per 9 innings pitched are common measures of power. An average pitcher strikes out about 5 batters per nine innings while a power pitcher will often strike out one or more every inning. The prototypical power pitcher is National Baseball Hall of Fame member, Nolan Ryan, who struck out a Major League Baseball record 5,714 batters in 5,386 innings. Ryan recorded seven no-hitters, appeared in eight Major League Baseball All-Star Games but also holds the record for most walks issued (2,795).

A famous fictional example of a power pitcher is Ricky "Wild Thing" Vaughn from the film Major League, a character sports journalist Scott Lauber once called "the power pitcher everyone on my high school baseball team wished they were". Actor Charlie Sheen performed that role; he had actually played baseball earlier in his life, prior to acting, as a pitcher. Additional, non-fictional prominent power pitchers include Hall of Famers Walter Johnson, Bob Gibson, Sandy Koufax, Randy Johnson and Bob Feller. Feller himself famously led his league in strikeouts and walks several times.

The traditional school of thought on power pitching was known as "throw till you blow". However, multimillion-dollar contracts have changed mentalities. The number of pitches thrown is now counted by a team's staff, with particular attention paid to young power arms. The care which some of the older power pitchers took with their arms has allowed for long careers and further opportunity after they have stopped playing. For example, player Roger Clemens has remained in the public eye for years.

See also 

Finesse pitcher
Power hitter
3000 strikeout club
List of Major League Baseball no-hitters
List of Major League Baseball pitchers who have thrown an immaculate inning

References 

Baseball pitching
Baseball strategy
Baseball terminology

ja:投手#技巧派投手